The 2015–16 season was Morecambe's ninth consecutive season in League Two, the fourth tier of English football.

They began the season on 8 August 2015, with the opening match of their League Two campaign. They also competed in three cup competitions, the FA Cup, the League Cup and the League Trophy.

They were eliminated in the First Round of both the FA Cup and the League Cup, but performed better in the League Trophy. Reaching the area semi-finals was their best performance for eight years. They knocked out three League One sides before losing 2–0 away to Fleetwood Town on 8 December 2015.

Competitions

Pre-season and friendlies
On 19 May 2015, Morecambe announced the dates for their home pre-season friendlies which included Bolton Wanderers and Bury. On 27 May 2015, Morecambe announced they will visit Nantwich Town. On 9 June 2015, Morecambe confirmed they will visit Kendal Town. On 19 June 2015, Morecambe announced two further pre-season friendlies. On 28 June 2015, Morecambe announced a Liverpool XI side will visit on 1 August 2015.

League Two

League table

Results by matchday

Matches
On 17 June 2015, the fixtures for the forthcoming season were announced.

FA Cup

The first round draw was made on 26 October 2015. Morecambe were drawn away to fellow League Two side Dagenham & Redbridge.

League Cup

The first round draw was made on 16 June 2015. Morecambe were drawn at home against Sheffield United.

League Trophy

The first round draw was made on 8 August 2015, by Women's World Cup bronze medalists Toni Duggan and Alex Scott. Morecambe were drawn at home against Walsall. On 5 September 2015, the second round draw was made by Charlie Austin and Ed Skrein. Morecambe were drawn away to Bury. The draw for the area quarter-finals was made on 10 October 2015. Morecambe were drawn away to Rochdale. The draw for the area semi-finals was made on 14 November 2015, by John Hartson and Paul Heaton. Morecambe were drawn away to Fleetwood Town. All the draws were shown live on Soccer AM.

Transfers

Transfers in

Transfers out

Total income:  £180,000

Loans in

Loans out

See also
List of Morecambe F.C. seasons

References

Morecambe F.C. seasons
Morecambe